HD 220105 is a star in the northern constellation of Andromeda, and a member of the Sirius supercluster. It lies near the lower limit of visibility to the naked eye at an apparent visual magnitude of 6.24, and can be a challenge to spot under normal viewing conditions. It is moving closer to the Earth with a heliocentric radial velocity of −2 km/s.

This is an A-type main-sequence star with a stellar classification of A5 Vn, where the 'n' notation indicates "nebulous" absorption lines due to rapid rotation. It is around 525 million years old with a high projected rotational velocity of 259 km/s. The star has 1.85 times the mass of the Sun and is radiating 19 times the Sun's luminosity from its photosphere at an effective temperature of 8,367 K.

HD 220105 has a magnitude 10.13 companion located at an angular separation of  along a position angle of 178°, as of 2015, and it is listed as a close binary by Zorec and Royer (2012).

References

External links
 Image HD 220105

A-type main-sequence stars
Double stars
Andromeda (constellation)
Durchmusterung objects
220105
115261
8884